Ronald Greensmith (22 January 1933 – 18 December 2015) was an English professional footballer who played as a winger in the Football League for Sheffield Wednesday and York City and in non-League football for Shiregreen Working Men's Club, Scarborough and Bridlington Town.

References

1933 births
2015 deaths
Footballers from Sheffield
English footballers
Association football wingers
Sheffield Wednesday F.C. players
York City F.C. players
Scarborough F.C. players
Bridlington Town A.F.C. players
English Football League players